Wood County Airport  is a county-owned, public-use airport located one nautical mile (1.85 km) northeast of the central business district of Bowling Green, in Wood County, Ohio, United States on the campus of Bowling Green State University. It is owned by the Wood County Airport Authority and is also known as Wood County Regional Airport (WCRA). As per the FAA's National Plan of Integrated Airport Systems for 2009–2013, it is classified as a general aviation airport.

History

Bricker Field
The airport was established in 1939, and purchased by Bowling Green State University in 1942 for use in the V-12 Navy College Training Program. On its acquisition it was named Bricker field after Ohio governor John W. Bricker. After the war, traffic at the airport decreased well below capacity. A Lockheed T-33 was added as a Gate guardian between 1965 and 1967. Bricker Field was transferred from the university to the local government in 1970.

Accidents and Incidents
 A Stearman Biplane crashed in a nearby farm during an attempted emergency landing on July 31st 1946 at 6:35PM, killing its pilot.
 A Vultee BT-13 Valiant crashed during landing at 3:30PM on September 23rd, 1950, killing its pilot. The pilot was from Custar and not a student.
 A Cherokee 140 crashed into Frazee Apartments a half mile from the airport on May 1st 1982 at 10:40AM. 4 on board the plane were killed, but there were no ground fatalities. In the immediate aftermath, the crash was attributed to the plane being overloaded for a flight bound for Columbus. The victims included the pilot, who was a BGSU junior, two people from Napoleon, Ohio, and a student of Northwest State Community College.
 In 1993 a pilot noticed a plane on the runway during his landing, aborting his landing to instead crash in a nearby field, avoiding serious injury, though damaging the plane seriously in the process.
 The roof of a hangar was destroyed by a storm in July 2003. Several planes were damaged.
 $60,000 was stolen from the airport between May 2007 and March 2008.
 The right landing gear of a Piper PA-28R-201 collapsed while taxiing after landing on September 13th, 2016 at 8:40AM. The aircraft was damaged, but its two occupants were uninjured.
 An MD-369 helicopter performing power line inspection for FirstEnergy crashed at 11:36AM on January  15th, 2018, 78 minutes after takeoff, causing the deaths of the powerline inspector and the pilot. The cause of the crash was identified as a loss of engine power at a low altitude with winter weather being a factor.

Facilities and aircraft 
It has two asphalt paved runways: 10/28 is 4,199 by 75 feet (1,280 x 23 m) and 18/36 is 2,628 by 50 feet (801 x 15 m).

For the 12-month period ending February 23, 2007, the airport had 27,405 aircraft operations, an average of 75 per day: 98.5% general aviation, 1% air taxi and 0.5% military. At that time there were 47 aircraft based at this airport: 87% single-engine, 9% multi-engine and 4% helicopter.

The university fleet at this airport consisted of 19 aircraft in 2019, all either single or multi engine propeller aircraft.

The airport has an AWOS IIIP/T in operation.

The Bowling Green Flight Center is a 16,800 square foot aviation education facility at airport run as part of the Bowling Green State University aviation program. It was opened on April 27th, 2015.

References

External links 
 Wood County Regional Airport
 Aerial photo as of 22 March 1994 from USGS The National Map
 

Airports in Ohio
Transportation in Wood County, Ohio
Buildings and structures in Wood County, Ohio
University and college airports